East India Station may refer to:
East Indies Station, a former British Royal Navy station
East India DLR station, a station on the Docklands Light Railway, London, England